Spartalizumab (INN; development code PDR001) is a monoclonal antibody and checkpoint inhibitor that is being investigated for melanoma.

This drug is being developed by Novartis. , spartalizumab is undergoing Phase III trials.

References 

Monoclonal antibodies